Vaso Sepashvili (born 17 December 1969) is a former Georgian professional footballer.

Club career
He made his professional debut in the Soviet Second League B in 1990 for FC Aktyubinets Aktyubinsk.

Honours
 Kazakhstan Premier League champion: 2000, 2001.

References

1969 births
People from Kakheti
Living people
Soviet footballers
Footballers from Georgia (country)
Association football forwards
Georgia (country) international footballers
FC Aktobe players
FC Armavir players
FC Kakheti Telavi players
FC Lada-Tolyatti players
FC Neftekhimik Nizhnekamsk players
PFC Spartak Nalchik players
FC Zhenis Astana players
FC Alazani Gurjaani players
Kazakhstan Premier League players
Erovnuli Liga players
Russian Premier League players
Expatriate footballers from Georgia (country)
Expatriate footballers in Russia
Expatriate footballers in Kazakhstan
Expatriate sportspeople from Georgia (country) in Russia
Expatriate sportspeople from Georgia (country) in Kazakhstan